Robert Naumann (July 31, 1862 – August 20, 1926) was an American farmer, businessman, and politician.

Born in the Town of Newton, Manitowoc County, Wisconsin, Naumann was a farmer. In 1895, he purchased a cheese factory of which he operated until 1916. Then, Naumann was involved in the taxi business. From 1923 until his death in 1925, Naumann served in the Wisconsin State Assembly and was a Republican. Naumann died in the Holy Family Hospital in Manitowoc, Wisconsin, where he had lived, following an operation.

Notes

1862 births
1926 deaths
People from Newton, Manitowoc County, Wisconsin
Businesspeople from Wisconsin
Farmers from Wisconsin
Republican Party members of the Wisconsin State Assembly